Mumamba Numba (born 21 March 1978) is a former Zambia International football midfielder who used to play for Zanaco FC. He had joined the team in 2001 from Konkola Blades. He is currently the head coach for ZESCO United F.C., having been appointed in September, 2020.

He represented the Zambian national team at the African Cup of Nations in 2000 and 2006.

External links

1978 births
Living people
Zambian footballers
Zambia international footballers
2000 African Cup of Nations players
2002 African Cup of Nations players
2006 Africa Cup of Nations players
Zanaco F.C. players
Association football midfielders